"Hibernaculum" is a song by musician Mike Oldfield, released on his 1994 album The Songs of Distant Earth. It charted at number 47 in the UK Singles Chart.

Two different versions of the single were released. The first contained several remixes of "Moonshine", the final part of Tubular Bells II, while the other contain unreleased material, including "The Song of the Boat Men", which would later be reused in another song called "Moonshine" on Oldfield's 2014 rock album, Man on the Rocks.

Track listing

UK CD 1 
 "Hibernaculum" – 3:32
 "Moonshine" (Festive Mix) – 3:41
 "Moonshine" (Solution Hoedown Mix) – 5:27
 "Moonshine" (Jungle Mix) (Featuring Rankin' Sean & Peter Lee) – 4:16

UK CD 2 
 "Hibernaculum" – 3:32
 "The Spectral Army" – 2:41
 "The Song of the Boat Men" – 2:52

Charts

References 

1994 singles
Mike Oldfield songs
Songs written by Mike Oldfield
Warner Music Group singles
1994 songs